Thailand participated in the 1974 Asian Games in Tehran on 1–16 September 1974. Thailand ended the games at 14 overall medals including 4 gold medals.

Nations at the 1974 Asian Games
1974
Asian Games